The Heavyweight competition at the 2013 AIBA World Boxing Championships was held from 14–26 October 2013. Boxers were limited to a weight of 91 kilograms.

Medalists

Seeds

  Teymur Mammadov (semifinals)
  Yamil Peralta (semifinals)
  Siarhei Karneyeu (second round)
  Clemente Russo (champion)
  Wang Xuanxuan (second round)
  Anton Pinchuk (third round)
  Emir Ahmatovic (third round)
  Erislandy Savón (quarterfinals)
  Chouaib Bouloudinat (third round)
  Samir El-Mais (second round)

Draw

Finals

Top half

Section 1

Section 2

Bottom half

Section 3

Section 4

References
Draw

2013 AIBA World Boxing Championships